The Zambia Basketball League is the first tier basketball league of Zambia. The league currently consists of 10 teams. It is organised by the Zambia Basketball Association (ZBA). In the past, the league was sponsored by Sprite and was named the Sprite ZBA.

The champions of the league are able to play in the qualifying rounds of the Basketball Africa League (BAL).

Teams
Matero Magic
UNZA Pacers
Munali Suns
Lusaka City Council Looters
Hawks
Green Buffaloes
Bulldogs
Green Eagles
Napsa Hurricanes
Nishati Denvers

Champions

Titles by team

Most Valuable Player

References

Basketball in Zambia
Basketball leagues in Africa
Sports leagues in Zambia